This is the discography of Hong Kong singer Prudence Liew.  Liew has released 13 cantopop albums and two mandopop albums since her debut in 1986.  Her albums have been certified multi-platinum by the Hong Kong IFPI, with her eponymous debut album, Prudence Liew selling over 500,000 copies, certifying 10× platinum.

After releasing 11 studio albums for BMG Music and later Columbia Records, Liew took a hiatus from 1995 to 2000 and relocated to San Francisco, USA following her first divorce.  In 2000, she signed with Taiwan record label, Rock Records to release her first mandopop album, Love Yourself.

Liew once again fell off the radar until 2008, when she announced a comeback concert series in Hong Kong and signed with Universal Music label, Cinepoly Records.

In 2009, Liew released her first cantopop studio album of 15 years titled, The Queen of Hardships  which peaked at the top spot on the HMV Hong Kong Asian Sales Chart upon its debut.  The album also spawned two top ten radio airplay singles.

In the 2010s, Liew is releasing a set of three audiophile cover albums, in three different languages.  In June 2011, she released her second Mandarin-language album Love Addict consisting of mandopop ballads originally sung by male artists.  In July 2012, Liew released a Cantonese cover album entitled Stolen Moments.  Liew plans of recording an English cover album to be released in 2013.

Studio albums

Live albums

Compilation albums

Extended plays

Video albums

Other appearances

References
General

Specific

Pop music discographies
Liew, Prudence